AWOL means "absent without leave".

AWOL may also refer to:

Arts and entertainment

Film and television
Absent Without Leave (film), a 1992 New Zealand film
AWOL (2016 film), a 2016 romantic drama, based on a 2010 short film of the same name
AWOL (2017 film), a 2017 Philippine action thriller
"A.W.O.L." (Arrow), an episode of the American TV series
Lionheart (1990 film), also known as AWOL
AWOL (TV series), a 1998 anime by Isamu Imakake

Music
A.W.O.L. (album), by AZ, 2005
"A.W.O.L.", a section of "B-Boy Bouillabaisse" by the Beastie Boys from the 1989 album Paul's Boutique 
"A.W.O.L.", a song by Exodus from the 1990 album Impact Is Imminent
"A.W.O.L.", a song by Yellowcard from the 2001 album One for the Kids
"AWOL", a song by Jethro Tull from the 1999 album J-Tull Dot Com
AWOL (rapper), from the gangsta rap group Bloods & Crips

Other uses in arts and entertainment
Albert Awol, a fictional boat captain in Jungle Cruise

People
Mohammed Awol (born 1978), Ethiopian athlete
Awol Erizku (born 1988), an Ethiopian–American contemporary artist

Other uses
Alcohol without liquid, a method of administering alcohol

See also

Absenteeism, a habitual pattern of absence from a duty or obligation without good reason
Awolnation, an American rock band